Le motorizzate ("The motorized women") is a 1963 Italian anthology comedy film written and directed by Marino Girolami.

Plot 
Five segments. Misadventures of a prostitute who works into a caravan placed under a viaduct. A walker  faces a foot race to the beat of music. The poor Urbano Cacace impersonates a traffic policeman in order to feed his family. A woman with her brand new car  hit a man who tries to take advantage of the incident attempting an insurance scam.

Cast 
Totò as Urbano Cacace
Walter Chiari as Walter 
Bice Valori as  Lola Rossi
Ave Ninchi as  Sister Teresa
Sandra Mondaini as The Lady Driver 
Raimondo Vianello as Camillo
Gianni Agus as The Prosecutor
France Anglade as Sister Maria 
Carlo Pisacane as  Achille
Valeria Fabrizi as  Valeria
Riccardo Billi as  Righetto
Michel Galabru  as  Pompeo Saronno
Vinicio Sofia as  Commendator Pelliccioni 
Anna Campori as  Miss Cacace 
Mario Castellani as  Inspector 
Pierre Doris  as Lola's Client 
Liana Orfei  as Cacace's Defence Counsel
Ennio Girolami  as Activist of Communist Party  
Corrado Mantoni as  narrator / interviewer

References

External links

1963 films
Films directed by Marino Girolami
Italian comedy films
1963 comedy films
1960s Italian-language films
1960s Italian films